Jennifer Armstrong (born 1961) is an author.

Jennifer or Jenny Armstrong may also refer to:

Sportspeople
Jennifer Armstrong (sailor) (born 1970), Olympic sailor for New Zealand and Australia
Jennifer Armstrong (British Columbia curler) in 2010 Curlers Corner Autumn Gold Curling Classic
Jennifer Armstrong (curler) (born 1992), New Brunswick curler

Others
Jennifer Armstrong (politician), member of the Alaska House of Representatives
Jennifer Armstrong, one of the Candidates of the 2007 Australian federal election
Jennifer Armstrong, character in Five Run Away Together